Violet Emily Mildred Bathurst, Lady Apsley, CBE (née Meeking; 29 April 1895 – 19 January 1966) was a British Conservative Party politician.  Upon the death of her husband, Lord Apsley, she succeeded him as Member of Parliament (MP) for Bristol Central in a 1943 by-election.  She held the seat until 1945 when it was taken by Labour.

Early life 
Violet Mildred Emily Meeking was born on 29 April 1895 in Marylebone, London. She was the daughter of Captain Bertram Meeking of the 10th Hussars and his wife, Violet Charlotte (née Fletcher). She would later use the name "Viola".

During World War I she served with a Voluntary Aid Detachment as a nurse and ambulance driver at Marsh Court Military Hospital. She had an early interest in politics and was president of the Southampton Women's Conservative Association in 1924.

On 27 February 1924, she married Lord Apsley and they had two sons: Henry Allen John (1927–2011) and George Bertram (1929–2010).

Apsley gained her pilot's licence in 1930 and served in the Auxiliary Territorial Service during the Second World War, resigning her commission after being elected to Parliament.

In 1930 she had a hunting accident which left her permanently disabled and unable to walk.

Before World War II Apsley and her husband supported pro-appeasement groups, sometimes speaking alongside fascist supporting speakers, and organised pro-appeasement talks in Bristol up to April 1939.

Parliamentary career 
Her husband died in an aircraft accident in 1942, and she succeeded him as Member of Parliament (MP) for Bristol Central, winning a 1943 by-election with a majority of 1,559. Her maiden speech in parliament was made from her wheelchair. In the 1945 general election Lady Apsley lost her seat. 

She contested the Bristol North East seat between 1947 and 1951, opposing the creation of the National Health Service and other elements of the welfare state, but was not re-elected to Parliament.

Later life 
Between 1952 and 1954 she was a member of the Central Council of the Victoria League. She held numerous offices in the Conservative Party, and was National Chairman of the Women's Section of the British Legion. She was made a Commander of the Order of the British Empire (CBE) in the 1952 Queen's Birthday Honours, "for public and social services".

Notes

References 
 Centre for Advancement of Women in Politics: Lady Apsley

External links 
 

1895 births
1966 deaths
Conservative Party (UK) MPs for English constituencies
UK MPs 1935–1945
Commanders of the Order of the British Empire
Female members of the Parliament of the United Kingdom for English constituencies
Violet
British courtesy baronesses and ladies of Parliament
20th-century British women politicians
British women aviators
Members of Parliament for Bristol
20th-century English women
20th-century English people